Chorispora is a genus of plant in the family Brassicaceae.

Chorispora tenella, known by several common names, including purple mustard, blue mustard, musk mustard, and crossflower is native to Eurasia but is well known in other parts of the world, particularly in temperate regions, as an introduced species and a noxious weed.

Species 
 Chorispora bungeana Fisch. & C.A. Mey. Enum. Pl. Nov. 1: 96 1841 
 Chorispora compressa Boiss. Ann. Sci. Nat., Bot., sér. 2 17: 385 1842 
 Chorispora exscapa Bunge ex Ledeb. Fl. Ross. 1: 169 1842  
 Chorispora gracilis Ernst Notizbl. Bot. Gart. Berlin–Dahlem 14: 348 1939 
 Chorispora greigii Regel Trudy Imp. S.-Peterburgsk. Bot. Sada 6: 296 1878 
 Chorispora hispida Regel Bull. Soc. Imp. Naturalistes Moscou 43(1): 266. 1870 
 Chorispora iberica DC.     
 Chorispora insignis Pachom.     
 Chorispora macropoda Trautv. Bull. Soc. Imp. Naturalistes Moscou 33(1): 109 1860 
 Chorispora pamirica Pachom.     
 Chorispora pectinata Hadač     
 Chorispora pectinata Hadac Feddes Repert. 81: 464 1970 
 Chorispora persica Boiss. Ann. Sci. Nat., Bot., sér. 2 17: 384 1842 
 Chorispora purpurascens Eig J. Bot. 75: 189 1937 
 Chorispora sabulosa Cambess. 1844 
 Chorispora sibirica (L.) DC. Syst. Nat. 2: 437 1821 
 Chorispora songarica Schrenk ex Fisch. & C.A. Mey. Enum. Pl. Nov. 2: 57 1842 
 Chorispora stenopetala Regel & Schmalh.     
 Chorispora stricta (Fisch. ex M. Bieb.) DC.     
 Chorispora syriaca Boiss. Ann. Sci. Nat., Bot., sér. 2 17: 384 1842 
 Chorispora tashkorganica Al-Shehbaz, T.Y. Cheo, L.L. Lu & G. Yang Novon 10(2): 106, f. 1 2000 
 Chorispora tenella (Pall.) DC. Syst. Nat. 2: 435 1821 
 Chorispora tianschanica Z.X. An in Fl. Xinjiangensis 2(2): 378 1995 
 Chorispora tianshanica Z.X. An

 Names brought to synonymy
 Chorispora elegans Cambess., a synonym for Chorispora sabulosa Cambess. 1844

References

External links
 

Brassicaceae genera
Brassicaceae